Bongani Sam (born 30 July 1997), is South African professional soccer player who plays as a defender for Orlando Pirates.

References

External links

1997 births
Living people
South African soccer players
Association football defenders
Highlands Park F.C. players
Bloemfontein Celtic F.C. players
Orlando Pirates F.C. players
Maritzburg United F.C. players
South African Premier Division players
National First Division players